The Motto della Tappa (also known as Cima Verta) is a mountain of the Lugano Prealps, located on the Swiss-Italian border.

References

External links
 Motto della Tappa on Hikr

Mountains of the Alps
Mountains of Switzerland
Mountains of Italy
Italy–Switzerland border
International mountains of Europe
Mountains of Ticino